The 2017–18 Senior Women's Challenger Trophy was the eighth edition of the women's List-A tournament in India. It was played from 4 January to 8 January 2018. It was played in a round-robin format, with a final between the top two teams. India Blue won the tournament, their fifth, beating India Green in the final.

Squads

Standings 

 The top two teams qualified for the final.

Group stage 
Source: BCCI

Final

Statistics

Most runs

Most wickets

References

2017–18 Indian women's cricket
2017–18
Domestic cricket competitions in 2017–18